Djourf Al Ahmar or Djourouf Al Ahmar is one of two departments in Sila, a region of Chad. Its capital is Am Dam.

Djourf Al Ahmar was formerly one of four departments in the Ouaddaï region of Chad. In 2008 the Sila region was created from the Ouaddaï region's former departments of Sila and Djourf Al Ahmar.

Sub-prefectures 
The department of Borkou is divided into three sub-prefectures:
 Am Dam
 Magrane
 Haouich 

Departments of Chad
Sila Region